Dino Belosević (born 5 June 1985) is Croatian kickboxer, W.A.K.O. amateur champion of the world in 2011.

Biography and Career
Before kickboxing he played basketball in second Croatian basketball league. Started kickboxing late, at the age of 19, in local gym "Dalmatian power" coached by Vedran Bađun. 2006 moved to "Pit bull" gym coached by Marko Zaja and become full contact Croatian champion 2010 moved from "Pit bull Split" to "Pit bull Zagreb" coached by Miro Jurac. Progressing in "Pit bull Zagreb" and training with coach Miro Jurac he became WAKO Amateur World Champion and multiple Croatian champion in full contact, thai boxing, low kick and K-1 style, also winning "Croatia open" low kick rules tournament.

In 2011 he became W.A.K.O. World, low kick champion, beating Hamza Kendircioglu, runner up from last years European championship and last World championship, Samed Osmanović, champion of Bosnia and Herzegovina in semi finals and winning gold medal against favored Dragan Jovanović from Serbia.

He challenged Freddy Kemayo for the vacant WAKO PRO K1 rules super heavyweight world championship, in Paris, France at FK-ONE event on 20 April 2013, losing by TKO in third round.

He was scheduled to fight Tomáš Hron at Glory 14: Zagreb undercard on 8 March 2014, however he was replaced with Kirk Krouba.

Titles
Professional
 2014 FFC Futures Tournament Champion +91 kg 
 2014 FFC Futures 2 Tournament Champion +91 kg

Amateur
 2016 I.F.M.A European Championship 2016 in Maribor, Slovenia  +91 kg
 2014 W.A.K.O. European Championships in Bilbao, Spain  +91 kg 
 2012 W.A.K.O. European Championships in Ankara, Turkey  +91 kg
 2012 European Savate Championship  +91 kg 
 2011 W.A.K.O. World Championships 2009 in Skopje, Macedonia  +91 kg

Kickboxing record

|-
|-  bgcolor="#CCFFCC"
| 2014-12-20 || Win ||align=left| Nato Cvitan || FFC Futures: Super Finale, Semi Finals || Abbazia, Croatia ||Decision (Unanimous) || || 2:00 || 5-2
|-
! style=background:white colspan=9 | 
|- 
|-  bgcolor="#CCFFCC"
| 2014-05-03 || Win ||align=left| Simon Krizmanić || FFC Futures 2, Final || Abbazia, Croatia ||Decision (Unanimous) || 3|| 2:00 || 4-2
|-
! style=background:white colspan=9 | 
|- 
|-  bgcolor="#FFBBBB"
| 2013-12-13 || Loss ||align=left| Rustemi Kreshnik || FFC10: Rodriguez vs. Batzelas || Skopje, Macedonia ||Decision (Unanimous) || 3|| 3:00 || 3-2
|- 
|-  bgcolor="#FFBBBB"
| 2013-04-20 || Loss ||align=left| Freddy Kemayo || FK-ONE || Paris, France ||TKO (Referee stoppage) ||3 || || 3-1
|-
! style=background:white colspan=9 | 
|-
|-  bgcolor="#CCFFCC"
| 2013-03-23 || Win ||align=left| Ahmet Yildirim || Obračun u Ringu 11  || Spalato, Croatia ||Decision (Unanimous) || 3|| 3:00 ||3-0
|-
|-  bgcolor="#CCFFCC"
| 2013-02-23 || Win ||align=left| Luis Morais|| SUPERKOMBAT New Heroes 1 || Abbazia, Croatia || Decision (Unanimous) || 3 || 3:00 || 2-0
|-
|-  bgcolor="#CCFFCC"
| 2012-12-15 || Win ||align=left| Geatan Sautron || Croatia Open 2012 - Christmas Cup || Osijek, Croatia || Decision (Unanimous) || 3 || 3:00 || 1-0
|-

|-
|-  bgcolor="#FFBBBB"
| 2016-10-27 || Loss ||align=left| Simon Ogolla || 2016 IFMA European Championships +91 kg, Semi Finals   || Split, Croatia || PTS || 3 || 3:00
|-
! style=background:white colspan=9 |
|-
|-  bgcolor="#CCFFCC"
| 2016-10-25 || Win ||align=left| Attila Gilányi || 2016 IFMA European Championships +91 kg, Quarter Finals   || Split, Croatia || PTS || 3 || 3:00
|-
|-  bgcolor="#FFBBBB"
| 2014-10-24 || Loss ||align=left| Ragim Aliev || W.A.K.O European Championships 2014, Low-Kick Semi Finals +91 kg  || Bilbao, Spain || 0:3 || 3 || 2:00
|-
! style=background:white colspan=9 | 
|-
|-  bgcolor="#CCFFCC"
| 2014-10-23 || Win ||align=left| Yosef Tktok || W.A.K.O European Championships 2014, Low-Kick Quarter Finals +91 kg   || Bilbao, Spain || 3:0 || 3 || 2:00
|-
|-  bgcolor="#CCFFCC"
| 2014-10-21 || Win ||align=left| Patrick Prozsek || W.A.K.O European Championships 2014, Low-Kick First Round +91 kg  || Bilbao, Spain || PTS || 3 || 2:00
|- 
|-  bgcolor="#CCFFCC"
| 2014-04-12 || Win ||align=left| Nato Cvitan || Croatian Kickboxing Championship, Low-kick Final +91 kg || Poreč, Croatia || 3:0 || 3 || 2:00
|-
! style=background:white colspan=9 |
|-
|-  bgcolor="#CCFFCC"
| 2014-04-12 || Win ||align=left| Simon Krizmanić || Croatian Kickboxing Championship, Low-kick Semi Finals +91 kg || Poreč, Croatia || 3:0 || 3 || 2:00
|-
|-  bgcolor="#FFBBBB"
| 2013-05-18 || Loss ||align=left| Ante Verunica || Croatian Kickboxing Championship, Low-kick Final +91 kg || Šibenik, Croatia || 0:3 || 3 || 2:00
|-
! style=background:white colspan=9 |
|-
|-  bgcolor="#CCFFCC"
| 2013-05-18 || Win ||align=left| Nato Cvitan || Croatian Kickboxing Championship, Low-kick Semi Finals +91 kg || Šibenik, Croatia || KO || 3 || 2:00
|-
|-  bgcolor="#FFBBBB"
| 2012-11-02 || Loss ||align=left| Ragim Aliev || W.A.K.O European Championships 2012, Low-Kick Semi Finals +91 kg  || Ankara, Turkey || 2:1 || 3 || 2:00
|-
! style=background:white colspan=9 | 
|-
|-  bgcolor="#CCFFCC"
| 2012-10-31 || Win ||align=left| Fatih Cimic || W.A.K.O European Championships 2012, Low-Kick Quarter Finals +91 kg  || Ankara, Turkey || TKO || 2 ||
|-
|-  bgcolor="#CCFFCC"
| 2011-11-02 || Win ||align=left| Dragan Jovanović || W.A.K.O World Championships 2011, Low-Kick Final +91 kg || Skopje, Macedonia || 3:0 || 3 || 2:00
|-
! style=background:white colspan=9 | 
|-
|-  bgcolor="#CCFFCC"
| 2011-10-28 || Win ||align=left| Samed Osmanović || W.A.K.O World Championships 2011, Low-Kick Semi Finals +91 kg || Skopje, Macedonia || TKO || 2 ||
|-
|-  bgcolor="#CCFFCC"
| 2011-10-27 || Win ||align=left| Hamza Kendircioglu || W.A.K.O World Championships 2011, Low-Kick Quarter Finals +91 kg || Skopje, Macedonia || 3:0 || 3 || 2:00
|-
|-  bgcolor="#FFBBBB"
| 2008-04-06 || Loss ||align=left| Ante Verunica || Croatian Kickboxing Championship, Low-Kick Final -91 kg || Osijek, Croatia || PTS || 3 || 2:00
|-
! style=background:white colspan=9 |
|-
|-  bgcolor="#CCFFCC"
| 2008-04-06 || Win ||align=left| N/A || Croatian Kickboxing Championship, Low-Kick Semi Finals -91 kg || Osijek, Croatia ||  ||  || 
|-
|-  bgcolor="#CCFFCC"
| 2008-03-22 || Win ||align=left| Boris Mišković || Croatian Kickboxing Championship, Full-contact Final -91 kg || Split, Croatia || KO ||  || 
|-
! style=background:white colspan=9 |
|-
|-  bgcolor="#CCFFCC"
| 2008-03-22 || Win ||align=left| Antun Batur || Croatian Kickboxing Championship, Full-contact Semi Finals -91 kg || Split, Croatia || PTS || 3 || 2:00
|-
|-
| colspan=9 | Legend:

See also
List of WAKO Amateur World Championships
List of WAKO Amateur European Championships
List of male kickboxers

References

External links
Official site of Pit Bull gym
Profile at 

Living people
1985 births
Croatian male kickboxers
Heavyweight kickboxers
People from Omiš
SUPERKOMBAT kickboxers